Robert W. Groves High School (also known as Groves High School or GHS) is a public secondary school located in Garden City, Georgia, United States, serving students in grades 9–12. The school is part of Savannah-Chatham County Public Schools, with admission based primarily on the locations of students' homes.

History

Long known as "the pride of the Westside," Groves High School has a rich community tradition that dates back to its founding in 1958.  Established to serve the young people and families of West Chatham County, the school is named for Robert W. Groves, a prominent business and civic leader in the county.  Besides his roles in business, commerce, and the community, Groves was concerned with the youth of the area and their educational needs.  To that end, he was an avid supporter, both financially and morally, for many programs at the school.

Since its inception, Groves High School's has fostered strong bonds with the community and its residents.  For decades, generations of Chatham County residents have been proud to send their children to this institution. The parents and even grandparents of many Groves students also attended Groves. Many faculty members are also alumni.

As of August 13, 2020, the school is being demolished to make way for a new institution accommodating grades K-12.

Notable alumni

 Donald Chumley, football player
 James "Ron" Helmly, retired U.S. Army lieutenant general
 Preston McGann, football player

References

External links
 

Schools in Chatham County, Georgia
Educational institutions established in 1958
Public high schools in Georgia (U.S. state)
1958 establishments in Georgia (U.S. state)